John Thomas "Jannie" Gibson (born 15 May 1941) is a Rhodesian former boxer. He competed in the men's light middleweight event at the 1964 Summer Olympics, representing Rhodesia. At the 1964 Summer Olympics, he lost in his first fight to Koji Masuda of Japan in the Round of 32.

References

External links
 

1941 births
Living people
Rhodesian male boxers
Olympic boxers of Rhodesia
Boxers at the 1964 Summer Olympics
Place of birth missing (living people)
Light-middleweight boxers